IFMC may refer to:

 Iowa Foundation for Medical Care
 International Folk Music Council
  Institute for Management Consulting